The  is the oldest extant collection of Japanese  (poetry in Classical Japanese), compiled sometime after AD 759 during the Nara period. The anthology is one of the most revered of Japan's poetic compilations. The compiler, or the last in a series of compilers, is today widely believed to be Ōtomo no Yakamochi, although numerous other theories have been proposed. The chronologically last datable poem in the collection is from AD 759 ( 4516). It contains many poems from a much earlier period, with the bulk of the collection representing the period between AD 600 and 759. The precise significance of the title is not known with certainty.

These songs were written by people of various statuses, such as the Emperor, aristocrats, junior officials,  soldiers ( songs), street performers, peasants, and  folk songs (Eastern songs). There are more than 2,100  poems by unknown authors.

The collection is divided into 20 parts or books; this number was followed in most later collections. The collection contains 265  (long poems), 4,207  (short poems), one  (short connecting poem), one  (a poem in the form 5-7-5-7-7-7; named for the poems inscribed on the Buddha's footprints at Yakushi-ji in Nara), four  (Chinese poems), and 22 Chinese prose passages.

The  is widely regarded as being a particularly unique Japanese work, though its poems and passages did not differ starkly from its contemporaneous (for Yakamochi's time) scholarly standard of Chinese literature and poetics; many entries of the  have a continental tone, earlier poems having Confucian or Taoist themes and later poems reflecting on Buddhist teachings. In addition, the language of many entries of the  exerts a powerful sentimental appeal to readers:

Name 

The literal translation of the kanji that make up the title  is "ten thousand — leaves — collection".

The principal interpretations of this name, according to the 20th century scholar , are:

 A book that collects a great many poems;
 A book for all generations; and:
 A poetry collection that uses a large volume of paper.

Of these, supporters of the first interpretation can be further divided into:

 Those who interpret the middle character as "words" (lit. "leaves of speech"), thus giving "ten thousand words", i.e. "many ", including Sengaku, Kada no Azumamaro and Kamo no Mabuchi, and;
 Those who interpret the middle character as literally referring to leaves of a tree, but as a metaphor for poems, including Ueda Akinari,  and Susumu Nakanishi.

Furthermore, supporters of the second interpretation of the name can be divided into:

 It was meant to wish for long life for the emperor and empress;
 It was meant to indicate that the collection included poems from all ages (proposed by Yamada).

The third interpretation of the name - that it refers to a poetry collection that uses a large quantity of paper - was proposed by Yūkichi Takeda in his , but Takeda also accepted the second interpretation; his theory that the title refers to the large volume of paper used in the collection has also not gained much traction among other scholars.

Periodization

The collection is customarily divided into four periods. The earliest dates to prehistoric or legendary pasts, from the time of Emperor Yūryaku (  – ) to those of the little documented Emperor Yōmei (r. 585–587), Saimei (r. 594–661), and finally Tenji (r. 668–671) during the Taika Reforms and the time of Fujiwara no Kamatari (614–669). The second period covers the end of the 7th century, coinciding with the popularity of Kakinomoto no Hitomaro, one of Japan's greatest poets. The third period spans 700 –  and covers the works of such poets as Yamabe no Akahito, Ōtomo no Tabito and Yamanoue no Okura. The fourth period spans 730–760 and includes the work of the last great poet of this collection, the compiler Ōtomo no Yakamochi himself, who not only wrote many original poems but also edited, updated and refashioned an unknown number of ancient poems.

Poets 

Princess Nukata's poetry is included in that of the first period (645–672), while the second period (673–701) is represented by the poetry of Kakinomoto no Hitomaro, generally regarded as the greatest of  poets and one of the most important poets in Japanese history. Other "third period" poets include: Yamabe no Akahito, a poet who was once paired with Hitomaro but whose reputation has suffered in modern times; Takahashi no Mushimaro, one of the last great  poets, who recorded a number of Japanese legends such as that of Ura no Shimako; and Kasa no Kanamura, a high-ranking courtier who also composed  but not as well as Hitomaro or Mushimaro. But the most prominent and important poets of the third period were Ōtomo no Tabito, Yakamochi's father and the head of a poetic circle in the Dazaifu, and Tabito's friend Yamanoue no Okura, possibly an immigrant from the Korean kingdom of Paekche, whose poetry is highly idiosyncratic in both its language and subject matter and has been highly praised in modern times. Yakamochi himself was a poet of the fourth period (730–759), and according to Keene he "dominated" this period. He composed the last dated poem of the anthology in 759.

Linguistic significance
This system uses Chinese characters in a variety of functions: logographically to represent Japanese words, phonetically to represent Japanese sounds, or sometimes in a combination of these.

However, specific parts of the collection, particularly volumes 14 and 20, are also highly valued by historical linguists for the information they provide on other Old Japanese dialects, as these volumes collectively contain over 300 poems from the Azuma provinces of eastern Japan—what is now the regions of Chūbu, Kanto, and southern Tōhoku.

Translations
Julius Klaproth produced some early, severely flawed translations of  poetry. Donald Keene explained in a preface to the Nihon Gakujutsu Shinkō Kai edition of the :

In 1940, Columbia University Press published a translation created by a committee of Japanese scholars and revised by the English poet, Ralph Hodgson. This translation was accepted in the Japanese Translation Series of the United Nations Educational, Scientific and Cultural Organization (UNESCO).

Another , excavated in 1997 from the Miyamachi archaeological site in Kōka, Shiga, contains poem 3807 in volume 16.

Plant species cited

A  is a botanical garden that attempts to contain every species and variety of plant mentioned in the anthology. There are dozens of these gardens around Japan. The first  opened in Kasuga Shrine in 1932.

Notes

References

Citations

Works cited

See also
Kotodama
Umi Yukaba
Reiwa

Further reading 
Texts and translations
 J.L.Pierson (1929): The Manyōśū. Translated and Annotated, Book 1. Late E.J.Brill LTD, Leyden 1929
 The Japanese Classics Translation Committee (1940): The Manyōshū. One Thousand Poems Selected and Translated from the Japanese. Iwanami, Tokyo 1940
 Kenneth Yasuda (1960): The Reed Plains. Ancient Japanese Lyrics from the Manyōśū with Interpretive Paintings by Sanko Inoue. Charles E. Tuttle Company, Tokyo 1960
 
 Theodore De Bary: Manyōshū. Columbia University Press, New York 1969

 

, Kanda University of International Studies, Chiba City

General

External links

Manyōshū – from the University of Virginia Japanese Text Initiative website
 Manuscript scans at Waseda University Library: 1709, 1858, unknown
 Manyōshū – Columbia University Press, Nippon Gakujutsu Shinkokai translation 1940, 1965

 
Japanese poetry anthologies
Old Japanese texts
Nara-period works
Asuka period
Nara period
8th-century Japanese books